Tetragnatha caudata is a species of long-jawed orb weaver in the family of spiders known as Tetragnathidae. It is found in North, Central America, Cuba, and Jamaica.

References

Tetragnathidae
Articles created by Qbugbot
Spiders described in 1884